Baron Herbert of Raglan may refer to:

Baron Herbert
Duke of Beaufort